"Looking Through the Eyes of Love" is a song written and composed by Barry Mann and Cynthia Weil. It first became a popular hit in 1965 by Gene Pitney. In 1972, The Partridge Family recorded a hit cover version.

Gene Pitney version
Gene Pitney was the first artist to have a hit recording of "Looking Through the Eyes of Love" in 1965. His version reached number 3 in both Canada and the United Kingdom, number 28 on the Billboard Hot 100, and number 34 in Australia in 1965.  It was featured on Pitney's 1965 album I Must Be Seeing Things.

The song was produced by Stan Kahan and Pitney.

The Partridge Family version
The Partridge Family released a cover version of the song as a single in 1972 that reached number 9 on both the U.S. adult contemporary chart and UK Singles Chart, number 16 in Canada, and number 39 on the Billboard Hot 100, the group's final Top 40 hit. Their cover was produced by Wes Farrell and released on Bell Records. It was featured on the 1972 album The Partridge Family Notebook.

Other versions
Marlena Shaw released a version of the song on her 1969 album The Spice of Life.
Rusty Bryant released a version of the song on this 1973 album For the Good Times.
David Cassidy released a solo version of the song on his 2002 album Then and Now.

References

1965 songs
1965 singles
1972 singles
Songs written by Barry Mann
Songs with lyrics by Cynthia Weil
Gene Pitney songs
The Partridge Family songs
David Cassidy songs
Musicor Records singles
Bell Records singles
Song recordings produced by Wes Farrell